The 1955 All-Ireland Junior Hurling Championship was the 34th staging of the All-Ireland Junior Championship since its establishment by the Gaelic Athletic Association in 1912.

Limerick entered the championship as the defending champions.

The All-Ireland final was played on 1 October 1955 at the Athletic Grounds in Cork, between Cork and Warwickshire, in what was their first meeting in the final. Cork won the match by 6-10 to 0-02 to claim their seventh championship title overall and a first title since 1950.

Results

All-Ireland Junior Hurling Championship

All-Ireland semi-finals

All-Ireland home final

All-Ireland final

References

Junior
All-Ireland Junior Hurling Championship